.32 caliber is a size of ammunition, fitted to firearms with a bore diameter of .

.32 in caliber variations include:
 .32 ACP (Automatic Colt Pistol), a pistol cartridge
 .32-40 Ballard, an American rifle cartridge
 .32 H&R Magnum, a rimmed cartridge designed for use in revolvers
 .32 Long Colt, an American centerfire fire revolver cartridge
 .32 NAA, a cartridge/firearm system from North American Arms and Corbon Ammunition using a .380 ACP case 
 .32 Remington, an American rifle cartridge
 .32 rimfire cartridge, chambered in revolvers and rifles in the late 19th and early 20th centuries
 .32 S&W, cartridge was introduced in 1878 for the Smith & Wesson model 1 revolver
 .32 S&W Long, a straight-walled, centerfire, rimmed handgun cartridge, based on the earlier .32 S&W cartridge
 .32-20 Winchester, the first small-game lever-action cartridge that Winchester produced
 .32 Winchester Self-Loading, an American rifle cartridge
 .32 Winchester Special, a rimmed cartridge created in October 1901 for use in the Winchester Model 94 lever-action rifle
 .327 Federal Magnum, a rimmed cartridge based on the .32 H&R Magnum with elongated case and higher pressure

See also
8 mm caliber
32 (disambiguation)

Pistol and rifle cartridges